Attila Supka (born 19 September 1962) is a Hungarian football manager and former player. He was one of the most successful Hungarian coaches in the 2000s.

Honours

As a manager
Debreceni VSC
Hungarian National Championship I: 2004–05, 2005–06

Budapest Honvéd FC
Hungarian Cup: 2006–07 runner-up 2007–08

References

External links
Attila Supka at Footballdatabase

1962 births
Living people
People from Hatvan
Sportspeople from Heves County
Hungarian footballers
Association football forwards
Budapest Honvéd FC players
Kecskeméti TE players
Újpest FC players
Debreceni VSC players
Fehérvár FC players
FC Sopron players
Hungarian football managers
Nemzeti Bajnokság I managers
Budapest Honvéd FC managers
Debreceni VSC managers
Békéscsaba 1912 Előre managers
Zalaegerszegi TE managers
Nea Salamis Famagusta FC managers
Soproni VSE managers
Pécsi MFC managers
Kisvárda FC managers
Mezőkövesdi SE managers
Hungarian expatriate football managers
Hungarian expatriate sportspeople in Cyprus
Expatriate football managers in Cyprus